Scott van-der-Sluis is a Welsh professional footballer, who plays for League of Ireland Premier Division side Shelbourne as a goalkeeper.

Early life

Van-der-Sluis was brought up by his Dutch mother in Connah's Quay, Wales and attended Wepre primary school.

Youth football and club career 

Van-der-Sluis signed for Manchester United as an eight-year-old in 2009.

A boyhood Liverpool fan, he moved to the Reds' academy in 2010 and spent five seasons with the club. 

After leaving Liverpool in 2015, van-der-Sluis joined Swansea City and moved to South Wales for an eventual four years, leaving at the expiration of his contract in 2019.

He has also played in the English non-league system, for Northwich Victoria, Runcorn Linnets and Merthyr Town.

Bangor City 

In 2021 van-der-Sluis came back to his native North Wales and signed for Cymru Leagues club Bangor City, quickly establishing himself as club-captain. However, following a Football Association of Wales league suspension that stopped the club from playing matches, van-der-Sluis left the club in early 2022.

Shelbourne 

On 16 June 2022 van-der-Sluis signed for League of Ireland Premier Division club Shelbourne.

Premier League winner and current Shelbourne manager Damien Duff said about his signing:
 "Scott has only trained with us this week but has already impressed us greatly. He has all the attributes we want from a goalkeeper so that is why the deal has been done so quickly. He is very ambitious and was eager to come to the LOI which speaks volumes about Shelbourne and the league."
On 26 August 2022 he made his debut for Shelbourne, keeping a clean sheet in a 4-0 FAI Cup win against Bonagee United. 

On 30 November 2022, he renewed his contract with Shelbourne for the upcoming 2023 League of Ireland season.

International career 

He has represented Wales at U15, U16 and U17 level a total of 10 times, winning the Victory Shield in 2015.

Personal life 

Van-der-Sluis currently resides in Dublin, Ireland. He is the younger brother of former professional footballer Jamie Reed.

References 

2001 births
Living people
People from Connah's Quay
Sportspeople from Flintshire
Welsh footballers
Association football goalkeepers
Shelbourne F.C. players
League of Ireland players
Expatriate association footballers in the Republic of Ireland